The Bottini di Siena are a complex system of medieval underground aqueducts for the water supply of the city of Siena with a total length of 25 km. The system used to be the main water supply of the entire city of Siena until 1914 and nowadays continues to supply water to the fountains of Siena.

Structure of the underground aqueduct system 

It is named after the Latin word buctinus, used for the first time in 1226, and the word botte (Italian for "barrels"), which describes the shape of the arched walls, mostly made of terracotta, composing the roofs of the underground tunnels of the aqueduct. The underground canal system of the Bottini (singular Bottino ) consists of several waterways which supply the wells within the city walls of Siena and in their vicinity, bringing water from sources located several miles away. The Bottini collect rainwater through the permeable roof, carrying it into the city, divert part of the Tressa, Staggia and Arbia rivers towards the city of Siena, collecting rainwater through the permeable roof along the way. This complex underground system was not only used to supply the city with drinking water, but also for the operation of many water-dependent medieval artisan industries (like dyers and leather workers), for cleaning and fire prevention activities, irrigation and agriculture, which would otherwise have been impossible in a city like Siena, located kilometers away from the nearest watercourse.

The Bottini are not to be seen as a uniform canal system. In addition to the main veins Bottino maestro di Fonte Gaia and Bottino maestro di Fontebranda and their side arms (called Ramo, plural rami) there are many independent Bottini that only feed individual fountains. The watercourses are not identical to the streets of Siena. Most of the canals (called Gorello , plural: gorelli) are about 20 to 30 centimeters wide and are mostly located in brick-walled corridors that are about 50 to 90 centimeters wide. The height of the corridors varies from 1.50 to 2 meters. The Bottini are not closed off from the outside world, there are several air shafts in each Bottino (called smiraglio, pl.: smiragli, sometimes also called occhio, pl.: occhi).

The Bottino maestro di Fonte Gaia is supplied by three main tributaries from Colombaio (also del Castagno, with 5.75 km of maximum distance from Fonte Gaia), Michele a Quarto (also San Dalmazio) and Uopini, which is close to the Fontebecci fountain. Smaller tributaries are that of Vico Alto (before Fontebecci in the Ramo di Colombaio) and those of Acqua Calda, Marciano and Poggiarello (between Fontebecci and Porta Camollia).  The entire route has a constant incline of 1 ‰ (1 m of difference in height over 1 km length)  and transports 2.7 liters per second. The excavations took place starting from two different points. One started from the Piazza del Campo to the north, while the other one starts from Santa Petronilla (near the Antiporto di Camollia), in the direction of Fonte Gaia (south) and in the direction of Fontebecci (north).

The Bottino maestro di Fontebranda is the shortest (most distant point 3.8 km north from Fontebranda), oldest and deepest of the two main canals. It starts north of the city walls and transports 3.5 liters per second. The most important tributary is the Ramo di Chiarenna, other important tributaries are those of Santa Petronilla and San Prospero.

History

First excavations and birth of the medieval aqueduct system 

The first underground watercourses already existed in the 4th century, during the Roman period, when Siena was still limited to the area of Castelvecchio. The Fontanella fountain is mentioned here in 394. The reason for the construction of the aqueduct system in the Middle Ages was mainly due to the shortage of water in the city of Siena, which experienced a period of strong population growth starting from the 11th century.

They were first documented with their Latin name in 1226 as Buctinus. Bricked Bottini were documented during the expansion works of Fontebranda in 1246 when thousands of stones were used. Further work on the tributaries took place in March 1250, here work was carried out on the wells of Val di Montone, Val di Follonica, Fontebranda, Pescaia and Vetrice, with that of Pescaia on the two main arms attached (Bottino di Fonte Gaia and Bottino di Fontebranda). In 1267 there were attempts to direct the waters of the Merse to Siena, but these plans failed shortly afterwards. After that, the focus was again on repairing the existing waterways. New water veins were found in 1274, which later led to the construction of the Fontenuova and Fonte d'Ovile fountains.

Development and evolution of the Bottini 

In order to finally lead the water to the central Piazza del Campo, the city government accepted on December 16, 1334, Jacopo di Vanni was entrusted with bringing the water from the veins to the north into the city and this, already in 1343, arrived in Piazza del Campo, the center of the life of the city. In 1343 the booty reached Fontebecci and an attempt was made to connect it to the water of the river Staggia, which is the real Quercegrossa. Since 1344, for the most difficult parts of the excavations, were hired professional miners from Massa Marittima and Montieri called Guerchi that received higher wages than the inexperienced workers Sienese. The first stones of Fonte Gaia were laid in April 1343, the fountain was consecrated in 1346 (with the water coming from Fontebecci) and then redesigned from 1409 to 1419 by Jacopo della Quercia. The Ramo di Uopini was completed in 1387. In order to increase the water quality, between 1437 and 1438, under the Prato di Porta Camollia, the Galazzoni were built a system that removes the impurities from the water by decanting it. These basins are 1.60 m deep and contain at least 1400 hl.  After 1466 no significant changes or extensions were made to the main structure of the Bottini system 1438.

The first private branches to private households emerged from 1474 onwards. In fact, on July 14, 1474, Alessandro di Mariano Sozzini received permission from the city government to build a drain near the Pantaneto fountain to his private residence in Via Pantaneto at his own expense. In September of the same year Pietro Forteguerri also received permission to draw water from the fountain in Via del Casato to his house. Bartolo di Tura also received permission in 1474 to create a private connection. The aim of allowing the creation of private connections was to reduce illegal discharges, the immense extent of which was officially denounced as early as 1446.

From the Florentine conquest of Siena to the unification of Italy 
The air shafts (smiragli) outside the city walls proved to be problematic in times of war. Already in the run-up to the Battle of Camollia (1526) the conspirator Lucio Aringhieri tried to bring troops into the city via the Bottini. In the run-up to the Fiorentine siege (1554–1555), the Bottini began to be walled up in March 1553 so that only water could flow under the barriers.

Throughout the period from the surrender of Siena in 1555 to the entry into operation of the Vivo aqueduct after the 1st World War, Siena continued to use the spoils as the only source of water supply.

From September 1691, some private individuals demanded and obtained connections to the municipal water supply through wells that collected the water from the gorello: based on how much they paid, they received the relative amount of water, measured by the municipality in "Dadi". The dado, also called forellino, was a small hole in the center of a plate that blocked the junction channel and corresponded to about 400 liters of water in 24 hours. People could have contracts for 1/2 dado, for 1, 2, 3 dadi, and so on.

The oldest planimetric map still in existence dates from 1768 and is now in the Siena State Archives. In July 1825, Giovanni Gani created a connection between the two main canals at an intersection near the Palazzo dei Diavioli. In order to supply water to the almost dry canal of Fontegaia, it was taken with two pumps from the canal of Fontebranda, located twenty meters below. After the waterflow in the Bottino of Fontegaia normalized, the connection was interrupted again in the same year. This system was used in 1835 and 1851 for the same reasons. In order to cope with the water shortage in the Fontegaia Canal, restoration work took place from 1851 to 1868, during which several areas of the canal affected by landslides were cleared. The (modernized) pump approach was resumed in 1870 when Vico Bello installed steam pumps. However, these were already moved in 1873 in the direction of the road to San Domenico; the length of the connecting pipe is 31 m. This connection also supplied the area of the Fortezza Santa Barbara fortress and was active until 1931.

The end of the Bottini as a water supply system for drinking water 
At the end of the 19th century, the water supply via the Bottini was no longer considered to be sufficient in quantitative and hygienic terms. From 1885, 18 sources were examined, from 1886 the rivers Arbia, Elsa and Masellone  as well as Bozzone (river), Staggia and Tressa were shortlisted, whether or not they corresponded to the water quality for the city supply. Ultimately, in 1895 the choice fell on the Vivo, which flow from the Monte Amiata. From just below the source at Vivo d'Orcia to the city of Siena, an underground aqueduct was built over the municipal areas of Castiglione d'Orcia, Montalcino, San Quirico d'Orcia (near Bagno Vignoni) and Murlo, which is called Acquedotto del Vivo and which today, alongside later supply lines (for example the Ente and Fiora rivers ), which supplies the city of Siena with drinking water. The aqueduct reached Porta San Marco on May 15, 1914, while the inner-city distribution system was completed in 1918.

Fountains 
The fountains belonging to the Bottini water system are divided into two categories. The main wells (fonti maggiori) include the wells that have larger water inlets, the secondary wells (fonti minori) include the wells whose water quantity and importance is much lower.

Main fountains

Secondary fountains

Citations

General bibliography 
 Antonio Maria Baldi: Gli antichi bottini senesi. In: Leonardo Lombardi, Gioacchino Lena, Giulio Pazzagli (Hrsg.): Tecnica di idraulica antica. Geologia dell'Ambiente, Supplemento al numero 4/2006 (Periodico della SIGEA, Società Italiana di Geologia Ambientale), Rom 2006 (Onlineausgabe, PDF)
 Comune di Siena (Hrsg.): I Bottini. Acquedotti medievali senesi. Edizioni Gielle, Siena 1984
 Comune di Siena, Santa Maria della Scala, Associazione La Diana (Hrsg.): A ritrovar la Diana. Protagon Editori, Siena 2001, 
 Duccio Balestracci, Laura Vigni, Armando Constantini: La memoria dell'Acqua. I bottini di Siena. Protagon Editori, Siena 2006
 Acquedotto del Fiora/La Diana (Hrsg.); Benedetto Bargagli Petrucci, Giacomo Luchini, Luca Luchini, Laura Vigni, Giacomo Zanibelli: Acqua per la città. Nel centenario dell'acquedotto del Vivo. Una tormentata avventura senese fra XIX e XX secolo. Tipografia senese, Siena 2014
 Fabio Bargagli Petrucci: Le fonti di Siena e i loro aquedotti, note storiche dalle origini fino al MDLV. Siena 1906 (Onlineausgabe bei archive.org, PDF)

External links

 Offizielle Webseite der Stadt Siena
 La Diana, Associazione La Diana, Website Bottini di Siena.
 Webseite des Museo dell'Acqua
 Enjoy Siena, Website Bottini di Siena.
 Enjoy Siena, Website Museo dell'Acqua.
 Bottini medievali senesi
 La mia terra di Siena: Fonti e bottini di Siena

Fountains in Siena
History of construction
Populated places established in the 1st millennium BC
Roman sites of Tuscany
Siena
Water
World Heritage Sites in Italy